Ahmad Nawaf Al-Ahmad Al-Sabah (born 1956) is a Kuwaiti politician and military official who is the current Prime Minister of Kuwait since July 2022. He is the eldest son of Nawaf Al-Ahmad Al-Jaber Al-Sabah, the incumbent Emir of Kuwait.

Former Positions 
He worked in the Ministry of Interior with the rank of Lieutenant-General, then retired in 2014 and held the position of Governor of Hawalli in the same year, and he represented the Emir of the country on more than one occasion. After Sheikh Mishal Al-Ahmad Al-Jaber Al-Sabah assumed the position of Crown Prince, the position of Deputy Chief of the National Guard became vacant, and he was appointed Deputy Chief of the National Guard with the rank of Minister on November 19, 2020, and continued in the position until March 9, 2022.

He was previously a member of the Al-Arabi Club's general assembly, and was the football manager during the club's golden age. He also served as the president of the International Police Federation, and he also headed the Kuwait Police Federation.

Ministerial Positions

Minister of Interior 
On March 9, 2022, an Emiri decree was issued appointing him as First Deputy Prime Minister and Minister of Interior.

Prime Minister 
On July 24, 2022, an Emiri Decree was issued by the Crown Prince of Kuwait, Sheikh Mishal Al-Ahmad Al-Jaber Al-Sabah, assigning him the role of prime minister and the formation of the fortieth government in the history of Kuwait, and the government formation decree was issued on August 1, 2022.

References

1956 births
Living people
Prime Ministers of Kuwait
Sons of monarchs